The Rheinisch-Bergische Kreis is a Kreis (district) in the Cologne Bonn Region of North Rhine-Westphalia, Germany. Neighboring districts  are Kreis Mettman, Oberbergischer Kreis and Rhein-Sieg, and the district-free cities Cologne, Leverkusen, Solingen and Remscheid.

History
The area of the Bergisches Land belonged to the earldom Berg for most of medieval times, and still gives the district its name.

In 1816 after the whole Rhineland area did come to Prussia the districts of Wipperfürth, Mülheim, Lennep, Opladen and Solingen were created on the area now covered by the district. In 1819 Opladen and Solingen were merged into a bigger Solingen district. In 1929 a new Rhein-Wupper district was created, while several municipalities were incorporated into the cities Wuppertal, Remscheid and Solingen. 1932 the districts Mülheim and Wipperfürth were merged to form the old Rheinisch-Bergische Kreis. Finally, in 1975 most area of the two districts Rhein-Wupper and Rheinisch-Bergisch was merged to form the current district.

Geography
The district form the western part of the Bergisches Land, where the hills of the Sauerland descend into the Rhine valley.

Coat of arms
The top part of the coat of arms show the geographical location of the district near the rhine valley - the silver band symbolized the Rhine river. This symbol comes from the coat of arms of the former prussian province Rhineland. In the left side the double bars are thought to symbolize a castle, they were used by the earls of Berg around 1100. When in 1225 the dukes of Limburg did take over they introduce their sign, the red lion with a blue tongue, into the coat of arms of the earldom.

Cities and municipalities

References

External links

Official website (German)

 
Districts of North Rhine-Westphalia
Bergisches Land